Albert Joseph Sarafiny (September 2, 1906 – February 11, 1981) was an American football player and coach.   He played college football at St. Edward's University and was the head football coach at his alma mater from 1929 to 1932.   Sarafiny played professionally as center in the National Football League (NFL) for one season, in 1933, with Green Bay Packers.

Head coaching record

Football

References

1906 births
1981 deaths
American football centers
Green Bay Packers players
St. Edward's Hilltoppers baseball coaches
St. Edward's Crusaders football coaches
St. Edward's Crusaders football players
People from Iron County, Michigan
Players of American football from Michigan